SN 1997D, discovered in January 1997 by Duília de Mello in galaxy NGC 1536 in Reticulum constellation is a first clearly identified example of atypical Type II supernova  with a very low luminosity and expansion velocity.

Progenitor

There are two alternatives, a high-mass 25-40 solar masses star or smaller star with mass of 8-10 solar masses. As there is no evidence that neutron star was formed during the collapse of the star, it is likely that star was in upper spectrum of the mass.

Remnants

Observations of the light curve from SN 1997D showed no evidence of other energy sources in the expanding supernova envelope therefore it is unlikely that a Neutron star was created, all the evidence leads to the creation of the stellar mass black hole of approximately 3 solar masses.

References

From twilight to highlight: the physics of supernovae : proceedings of the ... 
By Wolfgang Hillebrandt, Bruno Leibundgut

The fading of supernova 1997D
Benetti, S., Turatto, M., Balberg, S., Zampieri, L., Shapiro, S. L., Cappellaro

Supernovae
Reticulum (constellation)